De Rossi is an Italian surname, and may refer to:

Actresses 
Alessandra De Rossi (born 1984), Philippine actress
Assunta De Rossi (born 1983), Philippine actress
Barbara De Rossi (born 1960), Italian actress
Portia de Rossi (born 1973), Australian actress

Sportspeople 
Andrea de Rossi (born 1972), Italian former rugby union footballer and a current coach
Andrea de Rossi (archbishop) (1644-1696), Italian Roman Catholic Archbishop of Rossano
Daniele De Rossi (born 1983), Italian former footballer
Mino De Rossi (born 1931), Italian road bicycle and track cyclist

Clergy 
Bernardo de' Rossi (1468-1527), Italian bishop and patron of the arts
Biagio Proto de Rossi (1548-1646),  Roman Catholic Archbishop of Messina
Giovanni Battista de' Rossi (1698-1764), Italian Roman Catholic priest
Giovanni de Rossi (bishop) (died 1667), Roman Catholic Bishop of Ossero and Bishop of Chiron
Giuseppe de Rossi O.F.M. Conv. (1610–1659), Roman Catholic Bishop of Umbriatico
Giuseppe de Rossi (archbishop) (died 1610), Roman Catholic Archbishop of Acerenza e Matera, and Bishop of L'Aquila
Giovanni Girolamo de' Rossi (16th century), Italian Roman Catholic Bishop of Pavia
Ippolito de' Rossi (1531-1591), Italian Roman Catholic cardinal
Luigi de' Rossi (1474-1519), Italian Roman Catholic cardinal
Saint Giovanni Battista de Rossi (1698-1764), 18th-century Roman priest
Thomas de Rossi O.F M. (14th century), Scottish Franciscan friar, papal penitentiary, bishop and theologian

Nobility 
Angela de' Rossi (1506-1573), Italian noblewoman
Giovanni de' Rossi (1431-1502),  Italian condottiero and the fifth count of San Secondo
Guido de' Rossi (1440-1490), Italian condottiero
Pier Maria II de' Rossi (1413-1482), Italian condottiero and count of San Secondo
Pier Maria III de' Rossi (1504-1547), Italian general and nobleman

Artists 
Angelo de Rossi (1671-1715), Italian sculptor
Bernardino de Rossi (15th century), Italian artist at the court of Lodovico Sforza
Domenico de' Rossi (1659-1730), Italian sculptor and engraver
Francesco de' Rossi (1510-1563), Italian Mannerist painter
Giannetto De Rossi (1942–2021), Italian make-up artist
Giovanni Giacomo de Rossi (1627-1691), Italian engraver and printer, active in Rome
Properzia de' Rossi (1490-1530), Italian Renaissance sculptor

Architects 

 Giovan Antonio de' Rossi (1616–1695), Italian architect of the Baroque
 Mattia de Rossi (1637–1695), Italian architect of the Baroque period

Academics 
Azariah dei Rossi, an Italian-Jewish physician and scholar
Bernardo de Rossi, (born 1687), Italian theologian and historian
Elena De Rossi Filibeck (20th century), Italian writer on Tibetan subjects
Giovanni Battista de Rossi, 19th-century Italian archaeologist
Giovanni Bernardo De Rossi, 19th-century Italian Christian Hebraist
Michele Stefano de Rossi (1834-1898), Italian seismologist
Roberto de' Rossi, early humanist in Florence, a follower of Coluccio Salutati and, as the first pupil of Manuel Chrysoloras

Composers 
Camilla de Rossi (fl. 1670–1710), Italian composer
Fabrizio De Rossi Re (born 1960), Italian composer and librettist
Luigi de Rossi (c. 1597-1653), Italian Baroque composer

See also
 Rossi (surname)

Italian-language surnames